Billy Hayes Track is a track and field stadium located on the campus of Indiana University in Bloomington, Indiana. It is named after former Hoosier coach Earl C. "Billy" Hayes, who led the Hoosiers cross country team to 3 national titles. He also coached the indoor and outdoor track teams to a combined 5 Big Ten titles, coached 7 IU athletes to the Olympics, and was crucial in helping create the National Collegiate Cross Country Coaches Association.

Features
Billy Hayes Track features a Polytan surface. This surface was installed prior to the 2010 outdoor track season.  In addition to the surface, the track features 4 long jump and triple jump pits, 8 pole vault boxes, 2 shot put rings, 2 javelin runways, and 2 cages for discus and hammer throw. The track also includes 2 sprinting straightaways for competition depending on the direction of the wind. The facility contains 3200 permanent seats stretching from the start of the front straightaway all the way down into the first turn.  In addition, 3000 temporary bleacher seats can be installed around the track for bigger meets such as NCAA championship meets and the IHSAA state meet. New lights were installed in 2004 and new pole vault and high jump standards, new hurdles, and a new discus cage were introduced prior to the 2011 NCAA regional meet.

Meets
Billy Hayes track has hosted many important meets.  It hosted the NCAA national outdoor championships in 1997 and hosted the NCAA regional meet in 2005 and 2011.  Since 2004, Hayes Track has hosted the IHSAA state finals every year.  In 2012, along with hosting 2 college meets on April 21–22 and May 4 and the IHSAA meet on June 1 and June 2, Hayes Track will be hosting the USA Junior National championships, which will be held June 15 and 16 and feature the fastest youth track athletes in the country.

References

Sports venues in Indiana